Magdaléna Rybáriková was the defending champion, and she successfully defended her title, defeating Andrea Petkovic in the final, 6–4, 7–6(7–2). This was Rybáriková's final WTA singles title before her retirement in 2020.

Seeds

Draw

Finals

Top half

Bottom half

Qualifying

Seeds

Qualifiers

Draw

First qualifier

Second qualifier

Third qualifier

Fourth qualifier

References
General

Specific

Citi Open - Women's Singles